The 1587 siege of Akizuki, also known as the siege of Oguma, was undertaken by Japanese warlord Toyotomi Hideyoshi against the Akizuki clan's Oguma castle, as part of his campaign to conquer Kyūshū.

After seizing the nearby Ganjaku castle, controlled by a retainer to the Akizuki, Hideyoshi turned his attention to the Akizuki clan's home castle. As his army approached and prepared for the siege, however, Akizuki Tanezane, the lord of the castle, escaped and fled in the night.  Taking the castle, Hideyoshi is said to have covered the walls in white paper, to give the illusion that he had the resources to replaster the entire castle overnight. Seeing this, Tanezane surrendered without a fight.

References

See also
Akizuki Rebellion (1876)

1587 in Japan
Akizuki
Conflicts in 1587